Love, Honor and Behave is a 1938 American drama film directed by Stanley Logan and starring Wayne Morris and Priscilla Lane. The supporting cast includes John Litel, Thomas Mitchell, Dick Foran and Dickie Moore. "Bei Mir Bist Du Schon" serves as the motion picture's the theme song.  Initially set in Meadowfield, Long Island in 1922, the picture's plot revolves around a timid husband who finally stands up for himself in the wake of being cuckolded by his ravishing wife.

Plot 
Dan and Sally Painter meddle in son Ted's life, quarrel and ultimately divorce after Dan's affair with Lisa Blake, whose husband Jim promptly divorces her.

Ted's belief that sportsmanship comes before winning is tested during a college tennis match, which he loses on purpose after being awarded a point that should have gone to his opponent. His dad Dan doesn't approve of this attitude and predicts Ted will be a failure in his future business life.

Barbara Blake, daughter of Lisa and Jim, becomes attracted to Ted and persuades him to elope. She soon becomes bored, though, and when ex-suitor Pete Martin begins making passes at her, Ted mistakenly believes they've had a fling. Ted's business fails but Dan rejects his son's request for a job. Ted stands up to him and to Barbara, pleasing her, even though they end up having a knockdown fight.

Cast
 Wayne Morris as Ted Painter
 Priscilla Lane as Barbara Blake
 Dick Foran as Pete Martin
 Thomas Mitchell as Dan Painter
 Barbara O'Neil as Sally Painter
 John Litel as Jim Blake
 Mona Barrie as Lisa Blake
 Dickie Moore Ted Painter (as a child)
 Audrey Leonard as Barbara Blake (as a child)
 Minor Watson as Dr. MacConaghey 
 Donald Briggs as Tennis Coach
 Margaret Irving as Nan
 Gregory Gaye as the Count

External links
 Love, Honor and Behave in the Internet Movie Database

1938 films
1938 drama films
American drama films
American black-and-white films
Films set in 1922
Adultery in films
Films with screenplays by Clements Ripley
Films directed by Stanley Logan
1930s American films